In signal processing, phase noise is the frequency-domain representation of random fluctuations in the phase of a waveform, corresponding to time-domain deviations from perfect periodicity (jitter).  Generally speaking, radio-frequency engineers speak of the phase noise of an oscillator, whereas digital-system engineers work with the jitter of a clock.

Definitions
Historically there have been two conflicting yet widely used definitions for phase noise. Some authors define phase noise to be the spectral density of a signal's phase only, while the other definition refers to the phase spectrum (which pairs up with the amplitude spectrum) resulting from the spectral estimation of the signal itself. Both definitions yield the same result at offset frequencies well removed from the carrier. At close-in offsets however, the two definitions differ.

The IEEE defines phase noise as  where the "phase instability"  is the one-sided spectral density of a signal's phase deviation.  Although  is a one-sided function, it represents "the double-sideband spectral density of phase fluctuation".  The symbol  is called a (capital or uppercase) script L.

Background
An ideal oscillator would generate a pure sine wave.  In the frequency domain, this would be represented as a single pair of Dirac delta functions (positive and negative conjugates) at the oscillator's frequency; i.e., all the signal's power is at a single frequency.  All real oscillators have phase modulated noise components.  The phase noise components spread the power of a signal to adjacent frequencies, resulting in noise sidebands.  Oscillator phase noise often includes low frequency flicker noise and may include white noise.

Consider the following noise-free signal:
 .

Phase noise is added to this signal by adding a stochastic process represented by φ to the signal as follows:
 .

Phase noise is a type of cyclostationary noise and is closely related to jitter, a particularly important type of phase noise is that produced by oscillators.

Phase noise is typically expressed in units of dBc/Hz, and it represents the noise power relative to the carrier contained in a 1 Hz bandwidth centered at a certain offsets from the carrier. For example, a certain signal may have a phase noise of −80 dBc/Hz at an offset of 10 kHz and −95 dBc/Hz at an offset of 100 kHz. Phase noise can be measured and expressed as single-sideband or double-sideband values, but as noted earlier, the IEEE has adopted the definition as one-half of the double-sideband PSD.

Jitter conversions
Phase noise is sometimes also measured and expressed as a power obtained by integrating  over a certain range of offset frequencies. For example, the phase noise may be −40 dBc integrated over the range of 1 kHz to 100 kHz. This integrated phase noise (expressed in degrees) can be converted to jitter (expressed in seconds) using the following formula:

In the absence of 1/f noise in a region where the phase noise displays a –20dBc/decade slope (Leeson's equation), the RMS cycle jitter can be related to the phase noise by:
 

Likewise:

Measurement
Phase noise can be measured using a spectrum analyzer if the phase noise of the device under test (DUT) is large with respect to the spectrum analyzer's local oscillator. Care should be taken that observed values are due to the measured signal and not the shape factor of the spectrum analyzer's filters. Spectrum analyzer based measurement can show the phase-noise power over many decades of frequency; e.g., 1 Hz to 10 MHz.  The slope with offset frequency in various offset frequency regions can provide clues as to the source of the noise; e.g., low frequency flicker noise decreasing at 30 dB per decade (= 9 dB per octave).

Phase noise measurement systems are alternatives to spectrum analyzers. These systems may use internal and external references and allow measurement of both residual (additive) and absolute noise.  Additionally, these systems can make low-noise, close-to-the-carrier, measurements.

Spectral purity
The sinewave output of an ideal oscillator is a single line in the frequency spectrum. Such perfect spectral purity is not achievable in a practical oscillator. Spreading of the spectrum line caused by phase noise must be minimised in the local oscillator for a superheterodyne receiver because it defeats the aim of restricting the receiver frequency range by filters in the IF (intermediate frequency) amplifier.

See also
Allan variance
Flicker noise
Leeson's equation
Maximum time interval error
Noise spectral density
Spectral density
Spectral phase
Opto-electronic oscillator

References

Further reading

 

  Ulrich L. Rohde,  A New and Efficient Method of Designing Low Noise Microwave Oscillators, https://depositonce.tu-berlin.de/bitstream/11303/1306/1/Dokument_16.pdf
 Ajay Poddar, Ulrich Rohde, Anisha Apte, “ How Low Can They Go, Oscillator Phase noise model, Theoretical, Experimental Validation, and Phase Noise Measurements”, IEEE Microwave Magazine, Vol. 14, No. 6, pp. 50–72, September/October 2013.  
 Ulrich Rohde, Ajay Poddar, Anisha Apte, “Getting Its Measure”, IEEE Microwave Magazine, Vol. 14, No. 6, pp. 73–86, September/October 2013
 U. L. Rohde, A. K. Poddar, Anisha Apte, “Phase noise measurement and its limitations”, Microwave Journal, pp. 22–46, May 2013
 A. K. Poddar, U.L. Rohde,   “Technique to Minimize Phase Noise of Crystal Oscillators”, Microwave Journal, pp. 132–150,  May 2013.
 A. K. Poddar, U. L. Rohde, and E. Rubiola, “Phase noise measurement: Challenges and uncertainty”, 2014 IEEE IMaRC, Bangalore, Dec  2014.

Oscillators
Frequency-domain analysis
Telecommunication theory
Noise (electronics)